Battle of Tarain may refer to any of the following battles fought at Tarain (modern Taraori in Haryana, India):

 First Battle of Tarain (1191), in which the Chahamana king Prithviraj Chauhan defeated the Ghurid sultan Mu'izz al-Din
 Second Battle of Tarain (1192), in which the Ghurid sultan Mu'izz al-Din defeated the Chahamana king Prithviraj Chauhan 
 Third Battle of Tarain (1216), in which the Mamluk king Iltutmish of the Delhi Sultanate defeated and captured the former Ghurid general Taj al-Din Yildiz